Mika Mario Rokavec (born 5 January 1997) is a Slovenian football player. He plays for NK Rogaška.

Club career
He made his Slovenian PrvaLiga debut for Radomlje on 25 February 2017 in a game against Aluminij.

References

External links
 

1997 births
Living people
Sportspeople from Maribor
Slovenian footballers
Association football midfielders
Slovenia youth international footballers
Slovenian PrvaLiga players
Slovenian Second League players
NK Radomlje players
Slovenian expatriate footballers
Expatriate footballers in Austria
Expatriate footballers in Italy